The Seagull is a 1959 Australian television play based on the 1896 play by Anton Chekhov. Filmed in Sydney it stars Thelma Scott and was produced and adapted by Royston Morley.

Plot
In 1895 a vain and selfish actress, Irina, clashes with her son Konstantin who wants to be a writer. Her lover is Trigorin. Irinia lives at the estate of her brother Sorin.

Cast
Thelma Scott as Irina Arkadina
William Job as Konstantin
Roderick Walker as Trigorin
Delia Williams as Nina, Konstantin's love
 Gordon   Glenwright as Sorin, Irinia's brother
Walter   Pym as Ilya, Sorin's steward
Anne   Bullen as Polina 
Rilla   Stephens
Roderick   Walker
Henry   Gilbert as Yevgeny Dorn, a doctor
Frank Taylor as Semyon, a school master
Rilla Stephens as Masha the steward's daughter

Production
The show was recorded live in Sydney. Roderick Walker was an English actor. It was the first TV appearance for him, William Job and Thelma Scott; Job and Scott recently returned home after time overseas. Job went on to appear in Hamlet for Royston Morley.

See also
List of live television plays broadcast on Australian Broadcasting Corporation (1950s)

References

External links

1950s Australian television plays
1959 television plays